Kâzım Dirik (1881 in Bitola, Manastir Vilayet, Ottoman Empire – July 3, 1941 in Edirne) was an officer of the Ottoman Army and a general of the Turkish Army. During his political career he was Governor of Izmir between 1926 and 1935. In cooperation with the Peoples Houses, he encouraged the campaign which demanded from the population to only speak Turkish in 1934. After 1935, he also became the Inspector General of the Second Inspectorate-General in the Turkish western provinces and was involved in the Turkification and resettlement program of the Turkish Government. He presented the idea of the "Ideal Republican Village".

See also
List of high-ranking commanders of the Turkish War of Independence

Sources

External links

 Bilal N. Şimşir, "Cumhuriyetin İlk Çeyrek Yüzyılında Türk Diplomatik Temsilcilikleri ve Temsilcileri (1920-1950)", Atatürk Araştırma Merkezi Dergisi, Sayı 64-65-66, Cilt: XXII, Mart-Temmuz-Kasım 2006. 

1881 births
1941 deaths
People from Bitola
People from Manastir vilayet
Macedonian Turks
Ottoman Army officers
Turkish Army generals
Governors (Turkey)
Ottoman military personnel of the Italo-Turkish War
Ottoman military personnel of the Balkan Wars
Ottoman military personnel of World War I
Turkish military personnel of the Turkish War of Independence
Turkish military personnel of the Greco-Turkish War (1919–1922)
Ottoman Military Academy alumni
Ottoman Military College alumni
Recipients of the Medal of Independence with Red Ribbon (Turkey)
Burials at Turkish State Cemetery